The girls' freestyle 57 kg competition at the 2018 Summer Youth Olympics was held on 13 October, at the Asia Pavilion.

Competition format 
As there were ten wrestlers in a weight category, the pool phase will be run as a single group competing in a round-robin format.  Ranking within the groups is used to determine the pairings for the final phase.

Schedule 
All times are in local time (UTC-3).

Results 
 Legend
 F — Won by fall
 WO — Won by Walkover

Group Stages

Group A

Group B

Finals

Final rankings

References

External links 

 Schedule
 Sheets

Wrestling at the 2018 Summer Youth Olympics
2018 in women's sport wrestling